Sir Colley Harman Scotland (16 June 1818 – 20 January 1903) was the first Chief Justice of the Madras High Court in British India.

Scotland was born in the West Indies, the son of Thomas Scotland, Registrar of Antigua and deputy-paymaster of the British forces in Jamaica, and his wife, Sarah Haverkam.

He was called to the bar at the Middle Temple in 1843. He was successor of Sir Henry Davison as Chief Justice of the Supreme Court of Madras after he died at Ootacamund on 4 November 1860. He arrived at Madras on 23 May 1861 and was sworn in on 24 May 1861. He served as the first Chief Justice of the Madras High Court from 1861 to 1871. He also served as the Vice Chancellor of the University of Madras from 1862 to 1871.

References

1818 births
1903 deaths
Knights Bachelor
Chief Justices of the Madras High Court
Vice Chancellors of the University of Madras
Members of the Middle Temple
British India judges